LUF can mean multiple things:
 Liberala ungdomsförbundet, the Liberal Youth of Sweden
 Living Universe Foundation, is an organization that supports ocean and space colonization
 Lowest usable high frequency, a term used for radio transmission
 Luxembourgish franc, the ISO 4217 code for the former currency of Luxembourg

See also 
 Loof